This is a list of all tornadoes that were confirmed by local offices of the National Weather Service in the United States in August and September 2010.

United States yearly total

August

August 1 event

August 2 event

August 3 event (West)

August 3 event (Northeast)

August 6 event

August 7 event

August 9 event

August 10 event

August 11 event

August 12 event

August 13 event

August 16 event

August 19 event

August 20 event

August 22 event

August 30 event (West)

August 30 event (Southeast)

September

Note: 2 tornadoes were confirmed in the final totals, but do not have a listed rating.

September 1 event

September 7 event
The events in Texas were associated with Tropical Storm Hermine.

September 8 event
These events were associated with Tropical Storm Hermine.

September 9 event

September 13 event

September 14 event

September 15 event

September 16 event

September 21 event

September 22 event

September 25 event

September 27 event

September 30 event

See also
Tornadoes of 2010

References

 08
2010, 08
Tornadoes
Tornadoes